Isabella Amaryllis Charlotte Anstruther-Gough-Calthorpe (born 3 March 1980) is an English socialite, actress and model.

Early life
Isabella Amaryllis Charlotte Calthorpe, known by intimates as Bellie, was born on 3 March 1980 in Royal Hampshire County Hospital in Winchester. She is the daughter of John Anstruther-Gough-Calthorpe and Lady Mary-Gaye Georgiana Lorna Curzon. Her paternal grandfather is Sir Richard Anstruther-Gough-Calthorpe, 2nd Baronet and her maternal grandfather is Edward Curzon, 6th Earl Howe.

She has two full siblings (elder sister Georgiana, an artist, and younger brother Jacobi), and four half-siblings: two from her father's second marriage, including actress Gabriella Calthorpe; one from her mother's first marriage; and one from her mother's third marriage, the actress Cressida Bonas.

Calthorpe was educated at Heathfield School, Ascot, and Bradfield College, before going on to study Classics and Art History at the University of Edinburgh.

Career 

After attending the London Academy of Music and Dramatic Art from 2003 to 2005, she became a stage actress. She has also appeared in films Stage Beauty and How to Lose Friends & Alienate People, and the television series Harley Street and Trinity.

Filmography

Personal life
While single, she appeared regularly in the society pages of Tatler, Harper's Bazaar and Hello! 

On 6 March 2013, she married Sam Branson, filmmaker, former model, and son of business tycoon Sir Richard Branson. The couple married at his father's private safari lodge near Kruger National Park, with guests including Princess Beatrice of York and Princess Eugenie of York.

On 9 September 2014, it was announced on the Virgin website that the couple were expecting their first child, a daughter named Eva Deia Branson, who was born on 19 February 2015. They had their second child, a son named Bluey Rafe Richard Branson, on 18 January 2017.

References

External links
 William Addams Reitwiesner. "Ancestry of Isabella Calthorpe"
 
 Dafydd Jones A typical photograph of Isabella Calthorpe at the Tatler Little Black Book Party circa 2000.

1980 births
Living people
English film actresses
English television actresses
English female models
Gough-Calthorpe family
People educated at Heathfield School, Ascot
Actors from Winchester
Actresses from Hampshire
21st-century English actresses
Alumni of the University of Edinburgh
Alumni of the London Academy of Music and Dramatic Art
People educated at Bradfield College
Calthorpe, Isabella